Basil II was a Patriarch of the Bulgarian Orthodox Church in the mid 13th century. His name is known only from the medieval Book of Boril where he is listed as the second Patriarch presiding over the Bulgarian Church from Tarnovo, the capital of the Bulgarian Empire. Basil II lead the Church in a period of crisis for the Bulgarian state after the demise of the successful Emperor Ivan Asen II (r. 1218–1241).

References

Sources 
 

13th-century births
13th-century deaths
13th-century Bulgarian people
Patriarchs of Bulgaria
People from Veliko Tarnovo